Massaro Glunder-Timisela is a Dutch-Moluccan professional kickboxer. He is a former W5 72.5 kg Intercontinental champion.

Glunder was ranked in the Featherweight top ten by Combat Press from October 2015 until May 2016.

Kickboxing career
Massaro won the W5 72.5 kg Intercontinental Championship in 2015, with a unanimous decision win over Foad Sadeghi.

Glunder fought Kaew Fairtex for the K-1 65 kg title. Fairtex won the fight by a split decision.

Glunder was scheduled to fight Victor Pinto during Glory 51. He won the fight by a unanimous decision.

He fought with K-1 in 2018, when he fought Yasuhiro Kido. He lost the fight in the third round by DQ, as the referee judged Glunder spent too much holding Kido in the clinch. He lost his next fight against Aleksei Ulianov by decision as well.

He was then scheduled to fight Quade Taranaki during Glory 56. Glunder won the fight by a unanimous decision.

Glunder's next fight was a Super Fight Series headliner during against Kevin VanNostrand. Glunder lost the fight by a unanimous decision, after he was deducted a point for clinching.

Following these two losses, he was scheduled to fight Luke Whelan. Whelan was later replaced by Arbi Emiev. Glunder won the fight by a unanimous decision.

Glunder next faced Mohammed Jaraya during Glory's Collision 2 event. He lost the fight by a unanimous decision.

He was next set to face Jos van Belzen during Glory 76. The fight was later cancelled due to the COVID-19 pandemic.

Titles and accomplishments
2015 W5 72.5 kg Intercontinental Championship.
2013 KOK 65 kg World CUP/ HERO‘S 2013 Tournament Champion.

Kickboxing record

|-  bgcolor="#FFBBBB"
| 2019-12-21|| Loss||align=left| Mohammed Jaraya || Glory Collision 2 || Arnhem, Netherlands || Decision (Unanimous) || 3 || 3:00
|-  style="background:#cfc;"
| 2019-10-12 || Win ||align=left| Arbi Emiev || Glory 69: Dusseldorf  || Dusseldorf, Germany || Decision (Unanimous) || 3 || 3:00
|- style="background:#fbb;"
|-  style="background:#fbb;"
| 2019-03-09 || Loss||align=left| Aleksei Ulianov || Glory 64: Strasbourg  || Strasbourg, France || Decision (Unanimous) || 3 || 3:00
|- style="background:#fbb;"
| 2018-11-02 || Loss ||align=left| Kevin VanNostrand || Glory 61: New York || New York, United States || Decision  || 3|| 3:00
|-
|- style="background:#cfc;"
| 2018-08-10|| Win ||align=left| Quade Taranaki || Glory 56: Denver || Colorado || Decision (unanimous) || 3 || 3:00
|- style="background:#fbb;"
| 2018-06-17 || Win || align=left| Yasuhiro Kido || K-1 World GP 2018: 2nd Featherweight Championship Tournament  || Saitama, Japan || Disqualification  || 3|| 3:00
|-
|- style="background:#cfc;"
| 2018-03-03 || Win ||align=left| Victor Pinto || Glory 51: Rotterdam || Rotterdam, Netherlands || Decision (unanimous) || 3 || 3:00
|-
|- style="background:#fbb;"
| 2017-10-28 || Loss ||align=left|  Dylan Salvador || Glory 47: Lyon || Lyon, France || Decision (unanimous) || 3 || 3:00
|-
|- style="background:#fbb;"
| 2017-09-30 || Loss ||align=left|  Zakaria Zouggary || Glory 45: Amsterdam || Amsterdam, Netherlands || Decision (Unanimous) || 3 || 3:00
|-
|- style="background:#fbb;"
| 2017-06-10 || Loss ||align=left| Christian Baya || Glory 42: Paris || Paris, France || Decision (split) || 3 || 3:00
|-
|- style="background:#cfc;"
| 2017-06-10 || Win ||align=left| Niclas Larsen || Glory 42: Paris || Paris, France || TKO (2 knockdowns) || 1 || 2:18
|-
|- style="background:#fbb;"
| 2017-05-06 || Loss ||align=left| Wang Pengfei || Wu Lin Feng || Zhengzhou, China || Decision (Unanimous) || 3 || 3:00
|-
|- style="background:#fbb;"
| 2017-04-08 || Loss || align=left| Vlad Tuinov|| W5 Dubrovnik ‘The Undefeated’ || Dubrovnik, Croatia || Decicion || 3 || 3:00
|-  style="background:#cfc;"
| 2016-12-10 || Win ||align=left| Zhang Chunyu || Kunlun Fight 55 || China || Extra Round Decision (Unanimous) || 4 || 3:00
|- style="background:#fbb;"
| 2016-07-30 || Loss || align=left| Kim Minsoo|| Kunlun Fight 48 - 65 kg 2016 Tournament 1/8 Finals || Jining, China || Decicion || 3 || 3:00
|-  style="background:#Fbb;"
| 2016-06-24 || Loss || align=left| Masaaki Noiri|| K-1 World GP 2016 -65kg World Tournament, Quarter Finals || Tokyo, Japan || Decicion (Unanimous) || 3 || 3:00
|-  bgcolor=#CCFFCC
| 2016-05-21 || Win || align=left| Foad Sadeghi|| It's W5 Time XXXIII || Austria || Decision || 5 || 3:00
|-  bgcolor=#CCFFCC
| 2016-05-07 || Win || align=left| Yang Zhuo || WLF Glory of Heroes 2 || Shenzhen, China || Decision || 3 || 3:00
|-  style="background:#Fbb;"
| 2016-04-03 || Loss|| align=left| Mohammed El Messaoudi||World Fighting League || Netherlands || Decision  || 3 || 3:00
|-  style="background:#Fbb;"
| 2016-03-04 || Loss|| align=left| Kaew Fairtex|| K-1 World GP 2016 -65kg Japan Tournament || Tokyo, Japan || Decision (Split) || 3 || 3:00
|-
! style=background:white colspan=9 |
|-  bgcolor=#CCFFCC
| 2015-12-05|| Win||align=left| Foad Sadeghi  || W5 GRAND PRIX VIENNA XXXI || Vienna, Austria ||  Decision (Unanimous)|| 3 || 3:00
|-
! style=background:white colspan=9 |
|-  bgcolor=#CCFFCC
| 2015-11-21|| Win||align=left| Ren Hiramoto || K-1 World GP 2015 The Championship || Tokyo, Japan ||  Decision (Majority)|| 3 || 3:00
|-  style="background:#Fbb;"
| 2015-10-18|| Loss||align=left| Cedric Manhoef || WFL "Unfinished Business", 70 kg 4 Man Tournament Final ||  Hoofddorp, Netherlands ||  Decision|| 3 || 3:00 
|-
! style=background:white colspan=9 |
|-  bgcolor=#CCFFCC
| 2015-10-18|| Win||align=left| William Diender || WFL "Unfinished Business", 70 kg 4 Man Tournament Semi Finals ||  Hoofddorp, Netherlands ||  Decision|| 3 || 3:00
|-  style="background:#Fbb;"
| 2015-10-10|| Loss||align=left| Saenchai PKSaenchaimuaythaigym||Yokkao 15 || England|| Decision (Unanimous)  || 5 || 3:00
|-  style="background:#Fbb;"
| 2015-07-04|| Loss||align=left| Minoru Kimura||K-1 World GP 2015 -70kg Championship Tournament ||  Tokyo, Japan|| Extension round decision (unanimous) || 4 || 3:00
|-  bgcolor=#fbb
| 2015-05-24 || Loss||align=left| Hamza Essalih || Enfusion Kickboxing Talents || Amsterdam, Netherlands || Ext.R Decision|| 4 || 3:00
|-  bgcolor=#CCFFCC
| 2015-04-19 || Win||align=left| Masaaki Noiri || K-1 World GP 2015 -55kg Championship Tournament || Tokyo, Japan || TKO || 2 || 0:40
|-  bgcolor=#CCFFCC
| 2015-03-28 || Win||align=left| Alex Ciolac || Ronin || United Kingdom || KO (Right High Knee) || 3 || 1:20
|-  bgcolor=#CCFFCC
| 2013-11-16 || Win||align=left|Martynas Danius || KOK World CUP/ HERO‘S 2013 65 kg Tournament Final|| Vilnius, Lithuania || KO (Left High Kick)  || 2 || 2:45
|-
! style=background:white colspan=9 |
|-  bgcolor=#CCFFCC
| 2013-11-16 || Win||align=left|Deividas Danyla || KOK World CUP/ HERO‘S 2013 65 kg Tournament Semi Final|| Vilnius, Lithuania || KO (Knee)  || 1 || 2:55
|-  bgcolor=#CCFFCC
| 2013-10-10 || Win||align=left| Kevin Hessling || Fight Fans VI|| Netherlands || KO (Right High Kick) || 2 || 2:00
|-  bgcolor=#CCFFCC
| 2013-05-04 || Win||align=left| Araik Sargsian  || Ultimate Takedown 5 || Netherlands || Decision (Unanimous) || 5 || 2:00
|-  style="background:#c5d2ea;"
| 2012-11-24|| Draw||align=left| Romar Quandt||   2 the MAXX || Netherlands || Decision|| 3 || 2:00
|-  style="background:#c5d2ea;"
| 2011-06-06|| Draw||align=left| Ishak Ouaali ||  Push It 2 The Limit || Amsterdam || Decision|| 3 || 2:00
|-  bgcolor=#CCFFCC, 
|-
| colspan=9 | Legend:

Mixed Martial Arts record

 

|-
|Loss
|align=center|0-3
|Silvis Jansons
|Submission (kimura)
|Levels Fight League 6 
|
|align=center|2
|align=center|1:48
|Amsterdam, Netherlands
|
|-
|Loss
|align=center|0-2
|Alfrego Ruelas
|Submission (rear naked choke)
|Combate Global Exclusivo 
|
|align=center|1
|align=center|1:28
|Miami, Florida, USA
|
|-
|Loss
|align=center|0-1
|Andy Souwer
|Submission (armbar)
|World Fighting League MMA 
|
|align=center|3
|align=center|
|Almere, Netherlands
|
|-

See also
 List of male kickboxers
 List of Moluccan people

References

1994 births
Living people
Dutch male kickboxers
Sportspeople from Amsterdam
Kunlun Fight kickboxers
Featherweight kickboxers
Dutch male mixed martial artists
Mixed martial artists utilizing kickboxing